Touristville is an unincorporated community in Wayne County, Kentucky, in the United States.

Touristville has been noted for its unusual place name.

References

Unincorporated communities in Wayne County, Kentucky
Unincorporated communities in Kentucky